The Laois county hurling team represents Laois in hurling and is governed by Laois GAA, the county board of the Gaelic Athletic Association. The team competes in the three major annual inter-county competitions; the All-Ireland Senior Hurling Championship, the Leinster Senior Hurling Championship and the National Hurling League.

Laois's home ground is O'Moore Park, Portlaoise. The team's manager is Willie Maher.

The team last won the Leinster Senior Championship in 1949, the All-Ireland Senior Championship in 1915 and has never won the National League.

History
Laois won one All-Ireland Senior Hurling Championship title, in 1915, when the day was so wet the team reportedly played the second half in their overcoats.

Laois currently competes in the Liam MacCarthy Cup (Tier 1 of the Senior Hurling Championship), but has also won three All-Ireland Senior B Hurling Championships.

The hurlers reached National Hurling League semi-finals in 1981 and 1983  before losing the Centenary Cup hurling final to Cork in 1984, and were back in the National Hurling League semi-final in 1996.

Laois most recently contested the Leinster Senior Hurling Championship final in 1985, in what was to be a disappointing final defeat against Offaly.

Laois won the Joe McDonagh Cup in 2019, and went on to shock Dublin in the preliminary quarter-final the next week to reach the All-Ireland Quarter Final. This was considered one of the greatest shocks in the history of the championship. The manager departed amid controversy in November 2020 after his criticisms of county board officials appeared on a podcast.

Current panel

INJ Player has had an injury which has affected recent involvement with the county team.
RET Player has since retired from the county team.
WD Player has since withdrawn from the county team due to a non-injury issue.

Current management team
Appointed 12 September 2022:
Manager: Willie Maher

Backroom: Dan Shanahan (Lismore, Waterford)

Managerial history
Laois have a history of appointing "foreign" managers, with Georgie Leahy the most successful.

Georgie Leahy 1979–1985

Jimmy Doyle 1985–1987

Paddy Kelly 1987–1989

Georgie Leahy (2) 1989–1991

Paddy Doyle 1991–1993

Pat Critchley 1993–1995

Babs Keating 1995–1997

Pádraig Horan 1997–2000

Seán Cuddy 2000–2001

Pat Delaney 2001–2002

Paudie Butler 2002–2005

Dinny Cahill 2005–2006

Damien Fox 2006–2008

Niall Rigney 2008–2010

Brendan Fennelly 2010–2011

Teddy McCarthy 2011–2012

Séamus Plunkett 2012–2015

Ger Cunningham 2015**

Séamus Plunkett (2) 2015–2016

Éamonn Kelly 2016–2018

Eddie Brennan 2018–2020

Séamus Plunkett (3) 2020–2022

Willie Maher 2022–

**=In a caretaker role

Players

Notable players

All Stars
Laois has 1 All Star.

1985: Pat Critchley

Honours

National
All-Ireland Senior Hurling Championship
 Winners (1): 1915
 Runners-up (2): 1914, 1949
All-Ireland Senior B Hurling Championship
 Winners (3): 1977, 1979, 2002
Joe McDonagh Cup
 Winners (1): 2019
National Hurling League
 Semi-finalists (3): 1981, 1983, 1996
National Hurling League Division 2
 Winners (2): 1960, 1965
All-Ireland Under-21 B Hurling Championship 
 Winners (2): 2004, 2006

Provincial
Leinster Senior Hurling Championship
 Winners (3): 1914, 1915, 1949
 Runners-up (12): 1889, 1890, 1891, 1909, 1912, 1930, 1931, 1935, 1936, 1948, 1951, 1985
Leinster Junior Hurling Championship
 Winners (3): 1910, 1914, 1933
Walsh Cup
 Winners (2): 1980, 1991
Walsh Shield
 Winners (2): 2008, 2010
Kehoe Cup
 Winners (1): 1982
Leinster Under-21 Hurling Championship
 Winners (1): 1983
Leinster Minor Hurling Championship
 Winners (4): 1934, 1940, 1941, 1964

References

 
County hurling teams